Sarah Jones (Moore) is a British television reporter and presenter.

Moore grew up in Redditch, Worcestershire, England and studied Philosophy at the University of Warwick. Whilst at University she competed nationally in Latin and Ballroom dancing. She then studied at Cardiff Journalism School, whilst at the same time gaining work experience as a weekend news editor for a radio station in Wolverhampton, where she produced and presented news bulletins. She undertook her course work placement at ITV Central.

Media career
Her media career began as a reporter and presenter in 2003, working for ITV Central, where she won two awards for an investigation into drug-rape. In 2006 she moved to ITV News working as a reporter, before in October 2006 moving to GMTV, where she covered stories in Europe, the Caribbean and the UK. In summer 2007 she became New York Correspondent for GMTV, a post she held until August 2010.  Amongst other stories she reported from the campaign trail with Hillary Clinton in the 2008 U.S. Presidential Elections.

She played a role in the first Sex and the City movie after auditioning as part of a story.

Academic career
During the 2009/10 academic year she lectured on journalism at London Metropolitan University and gained her teaching qualifications. In September 2010 she moved to the University of Salford where she began to teach broadcast journalism. Moore is Head of the Birmingham School of Media at Birmingham City University.

References

External links
Official website

Living people
GMTV presenters and reporters
Alumni of the University of Warwick
Alumni of Cardiff University
Academics of London Metropolitan University
Academics of the University of Salford
ITV regional newsreaders and journalists
Year of birth missing (living people)